American Interior is the fourth solo album by Gruff Rhys, released on 5 May 2014. It is a concept album based on the life of the explorer John Evans. It peaked at number 24 in the UK.

Track listing

Personnel

Gruff Rhys - vocals, bass, acoustic guitar, percussion, keyboard, synths, production, mixing
Ali Chant - production, engineering (Toybox), mixing, timpani on "The Swamp"
Mike Mogis - engineering (Arc Studios)
Kris Jenkins - engineering (Wings for Jesus)
Andy Votel - production on "Allweddellau Allweddol"
Guy Davie - mastering
Gruff ab Arwel - string arrangements
Kliph Scurlock - drums on "American Interior", "100 Unread Messages", "The Whether (Or Not)", "The Last Conquistador", "Lost Tribes", "Iolo" and "Walk Into the Wilderness"
Chris Walmsley - drums on "Liberty (Is Where We'll Be)", "The Swamp", "Year of the Dog" and "Tiger's Tale"
Osian Gwynedd - piano
Jonathan Thomas - bass on "The Whether (Or Not)"
Alun Tan Lan - electric lead guitar on "100 Unread Messages", "Year of the Dog" and "Tiger's Tale", electric mandolin on "American Interior"
Lisa Jen Brown - harmony vocals on "100 Unread Messages"
Mari Morgan - violin
Francesca Simmons - violin
Rebecca Homer - viola
Elen Ifan - cello
Maggie Bjorklund - pedal steel guitar on "Liberty (Is Where We'll Be)", "Year of the Dog" and "Tiger's Tale"
Pete Fowler - artwork and design
Dylan Goch - photography
Ryan Owen Eddleston - photography

Critical reception
The album was well received by critics.

References

2014 albums
Gruff Rhys albums
Concept albums
Welsh-language albums
Albums with cover art by Pete Fowler